The Highway Hockey League is a men's senior ice hockey league sanctioned by Hockey Saskatchewan and Hockey Canada.

History
The league was formed in 1965 with five teams in Bulyea, Drake, Govan, Lumsden, and Strasbourg. Many teams have come and gone throughout the history of the league. Twenty-three towns have had teams in the league at one point. Teams compete for the HHL Robert Schultz Trophy and SHA Provincial championships.

The Raymore Rockets won the Robert Schultz Trophpy ten times, which is the most of any team.

Teams

** = currently on hiatus

Former teams
 Craik Warriors
 Davidson Cyclones - 1989 Provincial 'C' champs; 2010, 2011 Provincial 'D' champs
 Drake Canucks - 1974, 1976, 1978, 1990, 1994, 1995, 1996, 2013 Provincial 'D' champs; 2005, 2010 Provincial 'C' champs; 2012 Provincial 'B' champs
 Dysart Blues - 1987 Provincial 'A' champs
 Govan/Semans Clippers
 Indian Head Chiefs
 Ipsco Steelers/Regina Molson Exports - 1984 Provincial 'A' champs
 Liberty/Imperial
 Moose Jaw
 Piapot
 Regina Molson Canadians
 Regina Mustangs/Voyageurs
 Rouleau Ramblers
 Seamans Wheat Kings
 Strasbourg Lions/Mountaineers
 Westridge Bruins
 Wilcox

Champions

See also
List of ice hockey leagues
Big 6 Hockey League
Sport in Saskatchewan#Team sports

References

External links
 HHL website
 @HighwayHockey

Ice hockey leagues in Saskatchewan
Hockey Saskatchewan
Senior ice hockey